St Mary's on the Sturt is an Anglican church on South Road, St Marys, Adelaide, South Australia.

History
The original St Mary's Anglican church was built of native timbers on donated land on the Onkaparinga Road midway between the Sturt and Brownhill Creek crossings.
The first service held there was conducted on 4 July 1841 by Rev. C. B. Howard, then took alternate Sundays with James Farrell.

It has been called the third Anglican church in the colony, the first being Trinity Church in 1836. St John's church on Halifax Street, the contender for second place, however, did not hold its first service until 24 October 1841.

The church was built by voluntary labour, of stringybark (possibly Eucalyptus obliqua or Eucalyptus baxteri) timber, on land donated by John Wickham Daw (c. 1797–1872), and all materials and furnishings were paid for by voluntary contributions. The name was chosen by Daw in recognition of his home parish St Mary Abbots of Kensington. England.

This structure was always intended to be temporary, and the foundation stone for a new building was laid at the present site, some 200 metres south of the original, on 27 October 1846 by Miss Fanny Conway.
The new building, designed by Moses Garlick (c. 1784–1859), father of architect Daniel Garlick, and built of stone donated by the Ayliffe family, was completed and on 12 September 1847 the first service was conducted by Rev. James Farrell and Rev. W. J. Woodcock.
The church was consecrated by Bishop Short on 11 March 1849. That same year transepts, chancel, bell tower (later raised to a height of ), vestry and porch were added. A vicarage was completed around the same time.
St James's church, Blakiston, which was never substantially modified, was opened on 26 April 1847 and consecrated in 1848.

The old building served as a schoolroom for many years and was demolished in 1928.

The village of St Mary's on the Sturt, which became the Adelaide suburb of St Marys was named after the church.

The church, its graveyard and its gates were listed on the South Australian Heritage Register on 14 August 1986 and on the now-defunct Register of the National Estate on 15 May 1990.

Ministers
For most of the history of the church, the incumbent also had charge of Christ Church, O'Halloran Hill also St. Judes, Brighton from around 1855–1865
W. J. Woodcock c. 1847
J. Fulford 1847–1851
John W. Schoales 1851–1854
Robert Strong 1854–1856
Astley Cooper 1857–1860; left for Yankalilla district
George Dove 1861–1862; left for Walkerville, where he served for nearly 50 years, made Archdeacon
Rev. W. Dacres Williams 1863–1867; died at St Mary's on 5 March 1867
Dr Richard Francis Burton (c. 1811 – 24 February 1874) 1867
Alfred Honner 1869–1872
J. Leslie Smith 1872–1874
John Bach 1875–1879 left for Tasmania after successfully suing a parishioner for libel
William George Robinson (c. 1853 – 1 December 1879) 1879
F. T. Whitington 1880–1882, later Archdeacon of Hobart,
C. H. Young 1882–1884
William Samuel Moore 1884–1900 buried in the churchyard
T. Worthington 1900–1903 returned to England
King William Pobjoy (c. 1853 – 1 December 1931) 1903–1919
C. J. Whitfield 1919–1920
S. T. Longman 1920–1925 returned to England
S. J. Bloyd 1925–1932, left for Blakiston
Thomas Hopkins 1932–1939
Andrew G. Hay 1940–

Churchyard
The remains of several notables have been interred at St Mary's:
Capt. Ray Boucaut (died 29 January 1872)
Eustace Reveley Mitford
A newspaper reference asserts one James Penn Boucaut, presumably the son of Sir James Penn Boucaut who died in 1873, and a Miss Woodcock, perhaps Gertrude May Woodcock, (died 1878) daughter of Alfred Charles Woodcock, was the second

References

External links 
Anglican parish of St Marys website

1841 establishments in Australia
Anglican churches in South Australia
South Australian Heritage Register
South Australian places listed on the defunct Register of the National Estate
Churches in Adelaide